Elections to Newtownabbey Borough Council were held on 5 May 2011 on the same day as the other Northern Irish local government elections. The election used four district electoral areas to elect a total of 25 councillors.

Election results

Note: "Votes" are the first preference votes.

Districts summary

|- class="unsortable" align="centre"
!rowspan=2 align="left"|Ward
! % 
!Cllrs
! % 
!Cllrs
! %
!Cllrs
! %
!Cllrs
! % 
!Cllrs
! %
!Cllrs
!rowspan=2|TotalCllrs
|- class="unsortable" align="center"
!colspan=2 bgcolor="" | DUP
!colspan=2 bgcolor="" | UUP
!colspan=2 bgcolor="" | Alliance
!colspan=2 bgcolor="" | Sinn Féin
!colspan=2 bgcolor="" | SDLP
!colspan=2 bgcolor="white"| Others
|-
|align="left"|Antrim Line
|bgcolor="#D46A4C"|33.3
|bgcolor="#D46A4C"|2
|13.7
|1
|16.0
|1
|23.0
|2
|14.1
|1
|0.0
|0
|7
|-
|align="left"|Ballyclare
|bgcolor="#D46A4C"|55.2
|bgcolor="#D46A4C"|3
|29.6
|1
|15.2
|1
|0.0
|0
|0.0
|0
|0.0
|0
|5
|-
|align="left"|Macedon
|bgcolor="#D46A4C"|57.6
|bgcolor="#D46A4C"|4
|8.7
|1
|15.8
|1
|9.7
|0
|0.0
|0
|8.3
|0
|6
|-
|align="left"|University
|bgcolor="#D46A4C"|37.2
|bgcolor="#D46A4C"|3
|25.2
|2
|18.1
|2
|2.7
|0
|3.3
|0
|13.5
|0
|7
|-
|- class="unsortable" class="sortbottom" style="background:#C9C9C9"
|align="left"| Total
|43.5
|12
|19.7
|5
|16.4
|5
|9.6
|2
|5.3
|1
|5.5
|0
|25
|-
|}

Districts results

Antrim Line

2005: 3 x DUP, 1 x Sinn Féin, 1 x Alliance, 1 x SDLP, 1 x UUP
2011: 2 x DUP, 2 x Sinn Féin, 1 x Alliance, 1 x SDLP, 1 x UUP
2005-2011 Change: Sinn Féin gain from DUP

Ballyclare

2005: 3 x DUP, 2 x UUP
2011: 2 x DUP, 1 x UUP, 1 x Alliance
2005-2011 Change: Alliance gain from UUP

Macedon

2005: 3 x DUP, 1 x UUP, 1 x Newtownabbey Ratepayers, 1 x Independent
2011: 4 x DUP, 1 x UUP, 1 x Alliance
2005-2011 Change: DUP gain from Independent, Newtownabbey Ratepayers joins Alliance

University

2005: 3 x DUP, 2 x UUP, 1 x Alliance, 1 x United Unionist
2011: 3 x DUP, 2 x UUP, 2 x Alliance
2005-2011 Change: Alliance gain from UUP, United Unionist joins UUP

References

Newtownabbey Borough Council elections
Newtownabbey